Bruno Reichart (born 18 January 1943) is a retired German cardiothoracic surgeon who performed Germany's first successful heart transplant in 1981 and its first combined heart–lung transplant in 1983.

In 1984, he succeeded Christiaan Barnard at Groote Schuur Hospital in Cape Town and was appointed president of the International Society for Heart and Lung Transplantation (ISHLT) from 1988 to 1990. He returned to Munich in 1990 as director of the Cardiac Surgery Clinic at the Klinikum Großhadern of the University of Munich (LMU).

He has also been active in experimental research in xenotransplantation and from 2011 became a spokesman for funded research into the transplantation of pig tissue and organs into primates, with a team involving veterinarians, virologists, clinicians, lawyers and ethicists.

Early life and education
Bruno Reichart was born in Vienna in 1943 and grew up in Ingolstadt. He studied medicine at the University of Erlangen–Nuremberg and Munich University, now called Ludwig Maximilian University of Munich (LMU) and received his MD in 1968, after which he became a medical assistant at the First Gynecological Clinic of the University of Munich, the Surgical Department of the Municipal Hospital Munich-Harlaching and at the Medical Clinic of the University of Munich.

Early surgical career
From 1971 to 1973, Reichart worked as a surgical assistant under surgeon Rudolf Zenker and within a year was appointed visiting cardiac physician in Memphis, Tennessee, where he focused on heart, lung, and vascular surgery.

Upon his return to Munich in 1974, Reichart commenced surgery at the Cardiac Surgery Clinic at the LMU. In 1977 he became its senior physician and a year later he passed his habilitation with the topic "The mechanical support of acute right heart failure", and become a cardiothoracic surgeon in 1978.

Heart transplant 1981
On 19 August 1981, Reichart performed Germany's first successful heart transplant at the LMU. The procedure was previously performed more than 10 years earlier in 1969, when two heart transplants took place in the Cardiac Surgery Clinic at the LMU, but they were both unsuccessful, with one dying within two days of surgery, from a coronary thrombosis. Reichart's attempt in 1981 involved a 32-year old recipient who had experienced a heart attack a year earlier and was left with severely impaired left ventricular function. During the year until heart transplant, the recipient also experienced a large blood clot in the lung, acute heart failure and a stomach ulcer. The 23 year  old donor had been killed in a road traffic accident ten days prior to transplant. Azathioprine, cortisone and Anti-thymocyte globulin were the immunosuppressants used until two rejection episodes resulted in changing therapy to cyclosporine A three weeks after surgery and they were discharged from hospital at Christmas 1981.

Between 1978 and 1982, he held various professorships including the Universities of Boston, Birmingham, Milwaukee, Paris and Stanford.

More than twenty heart transplant procedures followed over the next three years. Under his leadership, intermittently spanning over 40 years at LMU, more than 1,000 heart transplants were performed.

Combined heart-lung transplant 1983
On 13 February 1983, Reichart was the first in Germany to perform a combined heart–lung transplant. The recipient was 27 years old and bed-bound with severe pulmonary hypertension and diseased liver and kidneys. The donor, three years younger, had died the previous day from a clot in the brain. Following the combined heart–lung transplant, the recipient died after ten days. Reichart was appointed professor at the LMU in the same year.

Later surgical career

In 1984 he became a cardiac surgeon at the South African Groote Schuur Hospital in Cape Town, succeeding Christiaan Barnard. Here, his research on baboons and green monkeys had been discontinued due to problems with its acceptance from society and the universities.

In 1990, he returned to Munich and was appointed director of the Cardiac Surgery Clinic at the Klinikum Großhadern of the LMU.

Xenotransplantation
In 2011, he became a spokesman for funded research into the transplantation of pig tissue and organs into primates (xenotransplantation,) leading a group that develops transgenic pigs.

To prevent hyperacute rejection and coagulation disorders, harmful pig genes are replaced with certain human genes. This German Research Foundation (DFG) funded research, the “Biology of xenogeneic cell, tissue, and organ transplantation – from basic research to clinical application” has involved collaborating with veterinarians, virologists, clinicians, lawyers and ethicists.

At his 75th birthday celebrations in 2018, he anticipated that it would take at least three years before the first human would be implanted with a pig's heart. His aspiration is to see that "the transplanted tissues and organs will in the future be genetically programmed to also carry an immunosuppressive molecule on all their cells, so that even fewer corresponding drugs are needed - or perhaps none at all".

Awards and honours
Reichart was president of the ISHLT from 1988 to 1990, who honoured him with the Pioneer Award for his work in heart surgery in Munich at their 35th annual meeting in 2015. He holds emeritus membership of the society.

Selected publications

Books
Crossing the Borders in Heart Surgery: Simple Thoughts, University of Cape Town, 1985, .

Articles

References 

German thoracic surgeons
German transplant surgeons
Living people
1943 births
University of Erlangen-Nuremberg alumni
Ludwig Maximilian University of Munich alumni
Academic staff of the Ludwig Maximilian University of Munich
History of heart surgery
History of transplant surgery
1981 in medicine
1983 in medicine